In algebra, a parabolic Lie algebra  is a subalgebra of a semisimple Lie algebra  satisfying one of the following two conditions:
These conditions are equivalent over an algebraically closed field of characteristic zero, such as the complex numbers. If the field  is not algebraically closed, then the first condition is replaced by the assumption that
  contains a Borel subalgebra of 

See also

 Generalized flag variety

Bibliography
 
 
 .
 

Lie algebras